Spirit Dance is the debut album by American violinist and composer Michael White featuring performances recorded in 1971 and released on the Impulse! label.

Track listing
All compositions by Michael White except as indicated
 "Spirit Dance" - 3:18   
 "The Tenth Pyramid" - 4:39   
 "John Coltrane Was Here" (Baba Omson) - 6:08   
 "Ballad for Mother Frankie White" - 7:23   
 "Samba" - 9:00   
 "Unlocking the Twelfth House" - 7:28   
 "Praise Innocence" - 3:18

Personnel
Michael White - violin, vocals
Ed Kelly - piano
Ray Drummond - bass
Baba Omson - percussion, bamboo flute, vocals
Makeda King, Wanika King - vocals (track 7)

References

Impulse! Records albums
Michael White (violinist) albums
1972 debut albums
Albums recorded at Wally Heider Studios